Sharon B. Emerson (born 1945) is an American biologist and was a research professor emeritus at the University of Utah.

In 1993, she was chair of the Division of Vertebrate Morphology of the American Society of Zoologists.
She taught at University of Illinois, Chicago.

Awards
1995 MacArthur Fellows Program

Works
"The ecomorphology of Bornean tree frogs (family Rhacophoridae)", Zoological Journal of the Linnean Society, Volume 101 Issue 4, Pages 337 - 357
"Allometric Prey of Predator-Prey Interactions", Ecological morphology: integrative organismal biology, Editors Peter Cam Wainwright, Stephen M. Reilly, University of Chicago Press, 1994,

References

20th-century American zoologists
University of Illinois Chicago faculty
University of Utah faculty
MacArthur Fellows
Living people
1945 births
Date of birth missing (living people)
Place of birth missing (living people)
American women biologists
Women zoologists
American women academics
21st-century American women
20th-century American women scientists